Guernsey is an organized hamlet within the Rural Municipality of Usborne No. 310 in the Canadian province of Saskatchewan. It previously held village status until it dissolved in 2005.

History 
Prior to December 31, 2005, Guernsey was incorporated as a village, and dissolved becoming under the jurisdiction of the Rural Municipality of Usborne No. 310.

Demographics 

Climate

See also 
 List of communities in Saskatchewan

References 

Designated places in Saskatchewan
Former villages in Saskatchewan
Organized hamlets in Saskatchewan
Unincorporated communities in Saskatchewan
Usborne No. 310, Saskatchewan
Populated places disestablished in 2005